In statistics, the Q-function is the tail distribution function of the standard normal distribution. In other words,  is the probability that a normal (Gaussian) random variable will obtain a value larger than  standard deviations.

If  is a Gaussian random variable with mean  and variance , then  is  standard normal and

where .

Other definitions of the Q-function, all of which are simple transformations of the normal cumulative distribution function, are also used occasionally.

Because of its relation to the cumulative distribution function of the normal distribution, the Q-function can also be expressed in terms of the error function, which is an important function in applied mathematics and physics.

Definition and basic properties 
Formally, the Q-function is defined as

Thus,

where  is the cumulative distribution function of the standard normal Gaussian distribution.

The Q-function can be expressed in terms of the error function, or the complementary error function, as

An alternative form of the Q-function known as Craig's formula, after its discoverer, is expressed as:

This expression is valid only for positive values of x, but it can be used in conjunction with Q(x) = 1 − Q(−x) to obtain Q(x) for negative values. This form is advantageous in that the range of integration is fixed and finite.

Craig's formula was later extended by Behnad (2020) for the Q-function of the sum of two non-negative variables, as follows:

Bounds and approximations
The Q-function is not an elementary function. However, the Borjesson-Sundberg bounds, where  is the density function of the standard normal distribution,

become increasingly tight for large x, and are often useful.

Using the substitution v =u2/2, the upper bound is derived as follows:

Similarly, using  and the quotient rule,

Solving for Q(x) provides the lower bound.

The geometric mean of the upper and lower bound gives a suitable approximation for :

 Tighter bounds and approximations of  can also be obtained by optimizing the following expression 

 

The Chernoff bound of the Q-function is

Improved exponential bounds and a pure exponential approximation are 

 

The above were generalized by Tanash & Riihonen (2020), who showed that  can be accurately approximated or bounded by

The coefficients  for many variations of the exponential approximations and bounds up to  have been released to open access as a comprehensive dataset.

 

 

 Using  and numerically integrating, they found the minimum error occurred when  which gave a good approximation for 

 

 Alternative coefficients are also available for the above 'Karagiannidis–Lioumpas approximation' for tailoring accuracy for a specific application or transforming it into a tight bound.

 

 The fitting coefficients  can be optimized over any desired range of arguments in order to minimize the sum of square errors (for ) or minimize the maximum absolute error (for ).

Inverse Q

The inverse Q-function can be related to the inverse error functions:

The function  finds application in digital communications. It is usually expressed in dB and generally called Q-factor:

where y is the bit-error rate (BER) of the digitally modulated signal under analysis. For instance, for QPSK in additive white Gaussian noise, the Q-factor defined above coincides with the value in dB of the signal to noise ratio that yields a bit error rate equal to y.

Values 
The Q-function is well tabulated and can be computed directly in most of the mathematical software packages such as R and those available in Python, MATLAB and Mathematica. Some values of the Q-function are given below for reference.

Generalization to high dimensions 
The  Q-function can be generalized to higher dimensions:

where  follows the multivariate normal distribution with covariance  and the threshold is of the form
 for some positive vector  and positive constant . As in the one dimensional case, there is no simple analytical formula for the Q-function. Nevertheless, the Q-function can be approximated arbitrarily well as  becomes larger and larger.

References 

Normal distribution
Special functions
Functions related to probability distributions
Articles containing proofs